USS Sacandaga (AOG-40) was a Mettawee-class gasoline tanker acquired by the U.S. Navy for the dangerous task of transporting gasoline to warships in the fleet, and to remote Navy stations.

Sacandaga was laid down on 4 August 1944 as MC hull 1803, by the East Coast Shipyard, Inc., Bayonne, New Jersey; launched on 24 September 1944; sponsored by Mrs. B. S. Chappelear; and commissioned on 9 November 1944.

World War II service 

After shakedown, Sacandaga departed the U.S. East Coast in January 1945 and proceeded, via the Panama Canal, to the U.S. West Coast. She arrived at San Diego, California, on 3 February and then moved on to Okinawa, stopping briefly at Pearl Harbor, Johnston Island, Eniwetok, and Ulithi.

Arriving at Okinawa on 16 May, she commenced operations under Commander, Service Squadron (ComServRon) 10 supplying aviation fuel to units afloat and ashore.

Destroyed in a typhoon 

Sacandaga operated in the Ryukyus, principally at Okinawa and Kerama Retto, until 9 October when, caught in a typhoon, she went aground at Baten Ko, Okinawa. Damaged beyond repair, Sacandaga was abandoned. She was decommissioned on 23 November and struck from the Navy list on 5 December. On 25 January 1946, she was declared a hazard to navigation and destroyed by demolition charges.

Military awards and honors 

Sacandaga earned 1 battle star during World War II.

References

External links 
 NavSource Online: Service Ship Photo Archive - AOG-40 Sacandaga

 

Mettawee-class gasoline tankers
Type T1-M-A2 tankers of the United States Navy
Ships built in Bayonne, New Jersey
1944 ships
World War II auxiliary ships of the United States
Shipwrecks in the Pacific Ocean